The 2010 North African Cup Winners Cup was the third edition of the competition initiated in 2008 by the UNAF. The competition pits the cup winners from Algeria, Libya, Morocco and Tunisia.

Algerian club ES Sétif won the competition after beating Libyan side Nasr 6-3 on aggregate in the final.

Participating teams
 ES Sétif (2009–10 Algerian Cup winners)
 Al-Nasr Benghazi (2009–10 Libyan Cup winners)
 FAR Rabat (2009 Coupe du Trône winners)
 Olympique Béja (2010 Tunisian President Cup winners)

Prize money
The following prize money will be handed out for the 2010 edition:

 Champions: $100,000
 Runner-up: $50,000
 Semi-finalists: $15,000

Draw
The draw was made in Tunis, Tunisia on September 14, 2010.

Semi-finals

|}

First legs

Second legs

Finals

|}

Champions

See also
 2010 North African Cup of Champions
 2011 North African Super Cup

References

External links
 goalzz.com

2010
2010 in African football
2010–11 in Moroccan football
2010–11 in Algerian football
2010–11 in Libyan football
2010–11 in Tunisian football